Fernando José da Silva Freitas Meira (born 5 June 1978) is a Portuguese former footballer who played mainly as a central defender.

In his country, he represented most notably Vitória de Guimarães, also playing one year with Benfica. After a lengthy spell in Germany with Stuttgart, he went on to appear for teams in Turkey, Russia and Spain.

A strong and skillful defender, Meira played 54 times for the Portugal national team, being part of the squads at the 2006 World Cup and Euro 2008.

Club career

Early career and Benfica
Born in Guimarães, Meira began his professional career with hometown's Vitória Sport Clube, but only had one solid season with its first team, in 1999–2000 (precisely his last), as he appeared in 30 of his 53 games with the Minho side. In 1998 he was also loaned, to F.C. Felgueiras of the second division, being an essential defensive unit as they narrowly missed out on promotion after finishing fifth.

In the summer of 2000, Meira joined Primeira Liga giants S.L. Benfica for a €4 million transfer fee plus one player. He played 31 matches in his first season – 30 starts – and was also awarded team captaincy, but the Lisbon club did not win any silverware during his stint.

Stuttgart
In January 2002, Meira signed for VfB Stuttgart in Germany for €7.5 million– it was the Bundesliga club's record transfer fee until July 2007, when they signed Ciprian Marica from FC Shakhtar Donetsk for €8 million, and general manager Rolf Rüssmann described the player as a "trophy" signing, showing great ambitions for the future. He made his league debut on the 26th in a 3–0 home win against Hamburger SV, playing the entire game as a stopper.

OMeira scored his first goal for Stuttgart on 23 February 2002, in a 1–1 draw at FC Hansa Rostock where he also conceded a penalty which resulted in the opponents' goal. His second came on 7 April in a 2–0 away victory over SC Freiburg, and he finished his first year with 14 league appearances to help his side finish in eighth position.

In the 2002–03 campaign, Felix Magath fielded Meira in 31 league games, and only a suspension prevented him from taking part in all 34 fixtures as they finished second behind FC Bayern Munich to achieve qualification honours to the UEFA Champions League. He missed two UEFA Cup matches, including the home win against Celtic in the round of 16's second leg, and found the net in the second round's 2–0 home defeat of Ferencvárosi TC.

For the 2006–07, Meira was named captain by manager Armin Veh, making him the first Portuguese ever to achieve that feat in the Bundesliga. He appeared in 20 matches and added three goals as the Baden-Württemberg club was crowned national champions for the first in 15 years, adding four in a runner-up run in the DFB-Pokal.

Over a six-and-a-half-year spell, Meira made 230 competitive appearances and scored 13 goals. He left the Gottlieb-Daimler-Stadion in summer 2008, aged 30.

Galatasaray
On 20 July 2008, at the end of the 2007–08 season, Stuttgart stripped Meira of the captaincy and announced their intention to sell the player. Two days later, he agreed to a four-year deal at Galatasaray SK for €4.5 million.

Meira made his official team debut in the season's Turkish Super Cup, a 2–1 win against Kayserispor, but left Turkey at the end of the campaign, with his team only ranking in fifth position in the Süper Lig.

Zenit
In mid-March 2009, after reported interest from FC Zenit Saint Petersburg as the player grew unsettled in Istanbul, Meira signed for the Russian club for €4.5 million, being awarded the number 3 shirt previously worn by Martin Škrtel.

He made his Russian Premier League debut on 15 March 2009, starting in a 1–1 away draw with FC Spartak Moscow. On 5 April he netted his first goal for his new team, in a 3–0 victory at FC Tom Tomsk.

Later years
On 15 August 2011, aged 33, Meira joined Real Zaragoza from Spain after mutually terminating his contract with Zenit. He made his official debut 13 days later, starting and being booked in a 0–6 home loss against Real Madrid.

In his spell with the Aragonese, Meira featured almost exclusively as a defensive midfielder, partnering Leonardo Ponzio. He terminated his contract on 1 February 2012, as the side were placed last in the league; late into the year, not being able to find a new club, he retired from football.

International career
After having earned 20 caps for the under-21s, Meira made his full debut for Portugal on 11 October 2000 in a 2002 FIFA World Cup qualifier against the Netherlands. In 2004 he played three games at the Summer Olympic Games, in an eventual group stage exit.

Meira was selected for the 2006 World Cup in Germany. Benefitting from injury to Jorge Andrade, he appeared in all of Portugal's seven matches in the tournament as the national team finished fourth.

Meira was also a regular fixture at UEFA Euro 2008 held in Austria and Switzerland, playing three group stage matches but missing the quarter-final clash with Germany, a 3–2 defeat.

Career statistics

Club

International

International goals

|}

Honours

Club
Stuttgart
Bundesliga: 2006–07
UEFA Intertoto Cup: 2002
DFB-Pokal runner-up: 2006–07
DFB-Ligapokal runner-up: 2005

Galatasaray
Turkish Super Cup: 2008

Zenit
Russian Premier League: 2010
Russian Cup: 2009–10
Russian Super Cup: 2011

Orders
Medal of Merit, Order of the Immaculate Conception of Vila Viçosa (House of Braganza)

References

External links

PortuGOAL profile

1978 births
Living people
Sportspeople from Guimarães
Portuguese footballers
Association football defenders
Association football midfielders
Association football utility players
Primeira Liga players
Liga Portugal 2 players
Vitória S.C. players
F.C. Felgueiras players
S.L. Benfica footballers
Bundesliga players
VfB Stuttgart players
Süper Lig players
Galatasaray S.K. footballers
Russian Premier League players
FC Zenit Saint Petersburg players
La Liga players
Real Zaragoza players
Portugal youth international footballers
Portugal under-21 international footballers
Portugal international footballers
2006 FIFA World Cup players
UEFA Euro 2008 players
Olympic footballers of Portugal
Footballers at the 2004 Summer Olympics
Portuguese expatriate footballers
Expatriate footballers in Germany
Expatriate footballers in Turkey
Expatriate footballers in Russia
Expatriate footballers in Spain
Portuguese expatriate sportspeople in Germany
Portuguese expatriate sportspeople in Turkey
Portuguese expatriate sportspeople in Russia
Portuguese expatriate sportspeople in Spain